The 2021 Norwegian Second Division (referred to as PostNord-ligaen for sponsorship reasons) was a Norwegian football third-tier league season. The league consisted of 28 teams divided into 2 groups of 14 teams.

The league was played as a double round-robin tournament, where all teams played 26 matches. The season started on 19 June 2021 and concluded on 14 November 2021.

Kongsvinger earned promotion from group 1 on 23 October 2021, three rounds before the end of the season. Skeid secured promotion from group 2 on 6 November 2021, following a 12–0 win against Rosenborg 2.

Team changes
The following teams changed division since the 2020 season.

To 2. divisjon
Relegated from 1. divisjon
 Kongsvinger
 Øygarden

From 2. divisjon
Promoted to 1. divisjon
 Bryne
 Fredrikstad

Group 1

Teams

The following 14 clubs compete in group 1:

League table

Results

Top scorers

Group 2

Teams

The following 14 clubs compete in group 2:

League table

Results

Top scorers

Promotion play-offs

The teams who finished in second place in their respective group qualified for the promotion play-offs, where they faced each other over two legs. The winner went on to play against the 14th-placed team in the First Division for a place in the First Division next season.

Hødd won 4–3 on aggregate.

References

Norwegian Second Division seasons
3
Norway
Norway